Gianpaolo Castorina (born 30 August 1976) is a retired Italian professional footballer turned coach.

Playing career
Castorina played in the Serie B for several seasons, reaching the peak of his playing career with Monza and Siena. He retired in 2010 after three years with Virtus Entella.

Coaching career
After his retirement, he switched into a coaching staff role at Virtus Entella, serving as first team assistant
and successively as youth coach. Under his guidance, the Primavera Under-19 team managed to reach the final of the Coppa Italia Primavera 2017, then lost to Roma 3–1 on aggregate.

On 30 April 2017, Castorini was promoted to the first team head coaching role until the end of the season after Roberto Breda's dismissal following three consecutive losses in the Serie B league which led Virtus Entella out of the promotion playoff zone. On 31 May 2017, Virtus Entella announced Castorina will serve as permanent head coach for the 2017–18 Serie B season. He was dismissed on 5 November 2017, due to poor results, and replaced by Alfredo Aglietti.

After his dismissal, he returned at Virtus Entella in 2018 as a youth coach, winning the Campionato Nazionale Dante Berretti title in 2019. He left the club in May 2020, ending a thirteen-year tenure with the Ligurian club.

References

External links
 

1976 births
Living people
Italian footballers
Association football defenders
Serie B players
A.C. Ancona players
A.C. Monza players
A.C.N. Siena 1904 players
S.S. Arezzo players
Italian football managers